Knut Walbye (born 9 January 1968 in Oslo) is a Norwegian former professional ice hockey player.

Walbye was drafted by the New York Islanders in the 7th round (139th overall) in the 1987 NHL Entry Draft but never played in the NHL. He played in Norway for Furuset, Manglerud Star and the now-defunct Spektrum Flyers.

Walbye played in the 1990 and 1992 IIHF World Championships for the Norway national team.

External links

1968 births
Living people
Furuset Ishockey players
New York Islanders draft picks
Norwegian ice hockey forwards
Spektrum Flyers players
Ice hockey people from Oslo
Manglerud Star Ishockey players